In category theory, a rig category (also known as bimonoidal category or 2-rig) is a category equipped with two monoidal structures, one distributing over the other.

Definition

A rig category is given by a category  equipped with:
 a symmetric monoidal structure  
 a monoidal structure 
  distributing natural isomorphisms:  and 
 annihilating (or absorbing) natural isomorphisms:  and 

Those structures are required to satisfy a number of coherence conditions.

Examples

Such categories where the multiplicative monoidal structure is the categorical product and the additive monoidal structure is the coproduct are called distributive categories.

Strictification

Requiring all isomorphisms involved in the definition of a rig category to be strict does not give a useful definition, as it implies an equality  which signals a degenerate structure. However it is possible to turn most of the isomorphisms involved into equalities.

A rig category is semi-strict if the two monoidal structures involved are strict, both of its annihilators are equalities and one of its distributors is an equality. Any rig category is equivalent to a semi-strict one.

References

 

Monoidal categories